Anarchy is the sixth studio album by anarcho-punk band Chumbawamba. Many of the tracks address specific social issues, such as homophobia, strikes or fascism.

Its graphic cover, depicting a baby's head emerging from a vagina, prompted the record to be banned from some shops and stocked in plain sleeves in others. The iTunes version of the album replaces the baby picture with a painting of several flowers.

Critical reception

In a review for AllMusic, Chris Nickson praised the album's "intelligence" and stylistic diversity, but the album was only awarded three stars. Music critic Robert Christgau regarded the album as "transient punk-style agitprop with announcements," awarding the album two honourable mention stars, and praising "Timebomb" and "Mouthful" as highlights. Gina Morris gave it 2 out of 5 in the June 1994 issue of Select and called it "disappointingly uninspired, pretty rather than poignant and flooded with lame clichés and, for the most part, feeble subjects."

Commercial performance
The album was a commercial success, giving the group their first top-40 album on the UK Albums Chart. The album debuted and peaked at number 29 on the chart dated 7 May 1994; it spent a total of three weeks on the chart before exiting the top 100.

Track listing

Song details
 The title of Give The Anarchist A Cigarette comes from a scene in the Bob Dylan documentary Dont Look Back in which Dylan's manager Albert Grossman tells him "They're calling you an anarchist now", to which Dylan replies "Give the anarchist a cigarette".
 The line "give the fascist man a gunshot" from Enough is Enough was referenced by Asian Dub Foundation in their song "TH9".
 The lyrics to Georgina reference the Peter Greenaway movie The Cook, the Thief, His Wife & Her Lover
 The title to the track "Doh!" is named after the catchphrase used by the cartoon character Homer Simpson. The catchphrase is heard at the end of the track.

Personnel 
Chumbawamba
 Harry Hamer
 Danbert Nobacon
 Paul Greco
 Lou Watts
 Dunstan Bruce
 Boff Whalley
 Alice Nutter
 Mavis Dillon

Additional personnel
 Neil Ferguson
 MC Fusion
 Simon "Commonknowledge" Lanzon - Accordion
 Kerry and Casey - "Georgina" intro
 Geoff Reid - Mandolin

References 

Chumbawamba albums
1994 albums
One Little Independent Records albums
Obscenity controversies in music